The 2017 ITTF Challenge Series was the inaugural season of the International Table Tennis Federation's secondary professional table tennis tour, a level below the ITTF World Tour.

Schedule

Below is the schedule released by the ITTF:

Winners

See also
2017 World Table Tennis Championships
2017 ITTF Men's World Cup
2017 ITTF Women's World Cup
2017 ITTF World Tour
2017 in table tennis

References

2017 in table tennis
ITTF Challenge Series